Maria de las Mercedes Mariana y María del Carmen de Foronda y Pinto (16 July 1914 – 12 November 1999), better known as Pituka de Foronda, was a Spanish actress. She appeared in more than twenty films from 1937 to 1996.

Filmography

References

External links 

1914 births
1999 deaths
Spanish film actresses
Spanish emigrants to Mexico